John O'May is an American-born Australian actor, best known for his stage performances.

O'May grew up in Baltimore and went to Patapsco High School, where he later become a teacher.

He came to Australia in 1972, where he replaced John Waters as Judas in Godspell. He created and performed in the revues Gershwin (with John Diedrich) in 1975 and The 20s and All That Jazz (with Diedrich and Caroline Gilmer) in 1977.

O'May played Che in the original Australian cast of Evita which opened in Adelaide in April 1980. In the 1980s he was a regular performer with the Melbourne Theatre Company, and played Bobby in Company for the Sydney Theatre Company in 1986 and Captain Corcoran in H.M.S. Pinafore for the Victoria State Opera in 1987.

He directed and starred in the musical Seven Little Australians in 1988.

O'May played Monsieur André in the original Australian cast of The Phantom of the Opera which opened at the Princess Theatre in Melbourne in December 1990. He later performed each of the two manager characters in various productions over the subsequent decades.

Other notable roles include John Wilkes Booth in Assassins in 1995, and Fredrik Egerman in A Little Night Music in 1997, both for the Melbourne Theatre Company. For the latter, he received a Green Room Award for male artist in a leading role. In 2014 he appeared as Doctor Tambourri in Sondheim's Passion.

Screen credits include supporting roles in the films Starstruck and Rebel and the television opera The Divorce.

References

External links

Profile, markgogoll.com

20th-century Australian male actors
21st-century Australian male actors
Australian male stage actors
Australian male film actors
Australian male television actors
Australian male musical theatre actors
Living people
Year of birth missing (living people)
Male actors from Baltimore